Piedrafita de Babia (Astur-Leonese: Piedrafita) is a locality located in the municipality of Cabrillanes, in León province, Castile and León, Spain. As of 2020, it has a population of 164.

Geography 
Piedrafita de Babia is located 89km northwest of León, Spain.

References

Populated places in the Province of León